Cnesinus is a genus of beetles in the subfamily Scolytinae. Species are from North America, Central America and South America.

References

External links 

 
 Cnesinus at insectoid.info

Curculionidae genera
Scolytinae